Havens Dumb is the fifth studio album by the Australian indie rock band Augie March. It was released on 3 October 2014 and it peaked at number 14 on the ARIA Charts.

The Guardian newspaper gave the album a lukewarm review, while FasterLouder gave the album four stars out of five.

Track listing
 "AWOL" – 3:58
 "After The Crack Up" – 4:16
 "Bastard Time" – 3:55
 "A Dog Starved" – 3:49
 "Hobart Obit" – 4:55
 "Father Jack And Mr. T" – 4:23
 "St. Helena" – 5:00
 "The Faking Boy" – 1:48
 "Definitive History" – 6:00
 "Villa Adriana" – 5:36
 "Millenarians' Mirror" – 3:49
 "Sailing To The Moon" – 2:55
 "Never Been Sad" – 7:20
 "The Crime" – 6:04

Charts

References

2014 albums
Augie March albums